Jouana Hamze (born 13 October 1988) is a Lebanese football coach and former player who is head coach of the Lebanon women's national under-18 team. She played as a defender for the Lebanon national team.

International career
Hamze made her senior debut for Lebanon on 19 October 2010, in a 5–1 defeat to Egypt. She capped during the 2010 Arabia Women's Cup, the 2011 WAFF Women's Championship and the 2014 AFC Women's Asian Cup qualification.

Managerial career
Hamze was head coach of the Lebanon women's national under-18 team at the 2022 WAFF U-18 Girls Championship, in which she helped Lebanon lift the title after defeating Syria 5–1 in the final.

Honours

Manager
Lebanon U18
 WAFF U-18 Girls Championship: 2022

See also
 List of Lebanon women's international footballers

References

External links
 

1988 births
Living people
Footballers from Beirut
Lebanese women's footballers
Women's association football defenders
Lebanon women's international footballers
Lebanese football managers
Female association football managers
Women's association football managers
21st-century Lebanese women